Erich Buck (born 5 January 1949) is a German former ice dancer who competed for West Germany. With his sister Angelika Buck, he is the 1972 European champion, a four-time World medalist, and a six-time West German national champion.

Career 
Angelika and Erich Buck were coached by Betty Callaway in Oberstdorf. They represented West Germany and the ERV Ravensburg club. 

The Buck siblings were the first Germans to capture the European ice dancing title. They did so at the 1972 European Championships in Gothenburg, upsetting Lyudmila Pakhomova / Alexander Gorshkov. They also won three silver medals at Europeans and four medals at the World Championships (three silver and one bronze). They took gold at the West German Championships six times.

The Buck siblings invented the "Ravensburger Waltz", which became one of the ISU's compulsory/pattern dances. They debuted it at the 1973 German Championships.

Personal life 
Erich Buck studied managerial economics at university in Munich. He manages an insurance office in his hometown, Ravensburg. He is married and has two children.

Results

References 
  Munzinger
  Wochenblatt online
  Skate Canada 2003 Ice Dance
 Eissport Magazin 6/95, page 20

1949 births
Living people
German male ice dancers
People from Ravensburg
Sportspeople from Tübingen (region)
World Figure Skating Championships medalists
European Figure Skating Championships medalists